Papst may refer to:
 the German word for Pope
 ebm-papst, manufacturer of fans

See also
Pabst